Heidelberger Druckmaschinen AG is a German precision mechanical engineering company with registered offices in Heidelberg (Baden-Württemberg) and headquarters in Wiesloch/Walldorf (Baden-Württemberg). The company offers product and services along the entire process and value chain for printing products and is the largest global manufacturer of offset printing presses. Sheet-fed offset printing is used predominantly for high-quality, multi-colour products, such as catalogues, calendars, posters, and labels. Heidelberg produces equipment for prepress, press and postpress.

Heidelberg is particularly well known in letterpress circles for the Original Heidelberg Platen Press, commonly known as the "Windmill" after the rotating arms of the paper feed mechanism. It was both power-driven and power-fed. They were manufactured in enormous quantities from 1927 through 1985, and many are still in service well into the 21st century.

By cooperating with Ricoh in 2011 Heidelberg entered a global distribution agreement contract to sell and support the Japanese company's latest production digital colour press, alongside their extensive offset press portfolio.

Like much of the printing industry, Heidelberg has suffered and its employees have been subject to layoffs and pay cuts in past years.

Heidelberg is cooperating closely with Adolf Mohr Maschinenfabrik GmbH & Co. KG and acquired the Gallus Holding in 2014. This extends the existing portfolio in terms of Postpress production and label printing. Heidelberg also develops new fields of business by offering industry solutions such as charging stations for electric cars or software solutions for the digital networking of today's process chains across industry.

References

External links

Druckmaschinen Datenbank Printing machines since 1900 – Summary of all offset and letterpress machines ever built, including Heidelberg models
Year of manufacture Tool for the calculation of the year of manufacture codes (1950–2004) for used Heidelberg printing machines.
 

Engineering companies of Germany
Printing press manufacturers
German companies established in 1850
Druckmaschinen
Companies based in Wiesloch
German brands